The 2018 Polish Basketball Cup was the 54th edition of Poland's national cup competition for men basketball teams. It was managed by the Polish Basketball League (PLK) and was held in Warsaw, in the Arena Ursynów in February 2018. Polski Cukier Toruń won its first-ever Cup title in club history.

Qualified teams
The eight first qualified after the first half of the 2017–18 PLK season qualified to the tournament. The highest placed four teams would play the lowest seeded teams in the quarter-finals. Legia Warsaw qualified as host of the tournament, and gained automatic qualification.

Draw
Matches were drawn on 11 January 2018.

Bracket

Final

See also
2017–18 PLK season

References

Polish Basketball Cup
Cup